State Route 138 (SR 138) is a  state highway in the northwestern part of the U.S. state of Georgia. The highway is a west-to-east route that travels within portions of Fulton, Fayette, Clayton, Henry, Rockdale, Newton, and Walton counties that connects Fairburn and Monroe.

Route description

SR 138 begins at an intersection with SR 92 (West Campbellton Street) in Fairburn, within Fulton County. In town, it heads southeast to US 29/SR 14 (Roosevelt Highway). It continues southeasterly to an interchange with Interstate 85 (I-85; James D. "Jim" McGee Memorial Highway) in Union City. Farther to the southeast is SR 279 (Old National Highway), just prior to reaching the tripoint that is the meeting point of Fulton, Fayette, and Clayton counties. It runs along the Fayette–Clayton county line for a short while. During that stretch, it intersects SR 314 (West Fayetteville Road). After entering Clayton County proper, it meets SR 85 in Riverdale. Northwest of Jonesboro is an intersection with SR 138 Spur (North Avenue), which is part of the former route of the SR 138 mainline through town. SR 138 now passes north of most of the town. Just to the northwest of SR 138 Spur is US 19/US 41/SR 3/SR 54 (Tara Boulevard). On the northeastern edge of town, SR 54 splits off to the northeast on Jonesboro Road, and SR 138 curves to the southeast to meet is second intersection with SR 138 Spur (Stockbridge Road/Lake Spivey Parkway). Just before crossing into Henry County, SR 138 enters Stockbridge. In town, it has an interchange with I-75. It has an interchange with I-675 (Terrell Starr Parkway), during that stretch. After re-entering both Henry County and Stockbridge's city limits, the road meets US 23/SR 42 (North Henry Boulevard). The three routes head concurrent to the east, until just outside the city. After the concurrency ends, SR 138 heads northeast to an intersection with SR 155 (Snapfinger Road), just before entering Rockdale County. The road crosses over the South River and intersects SR 212 (Scott Highway). In Conyers, SR 138 meets SR 20 (McDonough Highway). The two routes run concurrently to the north and northeast through town, with an interchange with I-20/US 278/SR 12 (Purple Heart Highway), until SR 20 heads northwest on Sigman Road NE and SR 138 continues to the northeast in the northeastern part of town. The highway crosses over the Yellow River and cuts across the northernmost corner of Newton County, before entering Walton County. Shortly after the county line is Walnut Grove, where SR 81 (Leone Avenue) runs through. SR 138 continues to the northeast and enters Monroe. In town, is an intersection with SR 10 Business (West Spring Street). It then meets at an interchange with US 78/SR 10. It then finally meets its eastern terminus a fifth of a mile north of the previous interchange. The roadway continues northeast for a mile as Charlotte Rowell Boulevard to Georgia State Route 11 in Monroe.

All of SR 138 from I-85 to I-20 is part of the National Highway System, a system of roadways important to the nation's economy, defense, and mobility.

History
An old portion of SR 138 with a steel truss bridge crossing the Alcovy River in Walton County still exists on privately owned property.

Major intersections

Bannered route

Until the early 1990s, it was part of SR 138 proper, which ran through downtown Jonesboro at the time. Around that time, a new bypass was built around the north side of the city. It initially received the designation SR 138 Spur; however, once the bypass was completed, the SR 138 and SR 138 Spur designations were swapped and the new SR 138 Spur truncated to Tara Boulevard on the west side of Jonesboro. Some street signs on the northern bypass, now the SR 138 mainline, still incorrectly refer to the road as "Spur 138".

See also

References

External links
 Georgia Roads (Routes 121 - 140)
 Georgia State Route 138 on State-Ends.com
 Georgia State Route 138 SPUR on State-Ends.com

138
Transportation in Fulton County, Georgia
Transportation in Fayette County, Georgia
Transportation in Clayton County, Georgia
Transportation in Henry County, Georgia
Transportation in Rockdale County, Georgia
Transportation in Newton County, Georgia
Transportation in Walton County, Georgia